XHQRO-FM is a radio station on 107.5 FM in Cortázar, Guanajuato, serving Celaya and Querétaro, Querétaro. XHQRO is owned by Corporación Bajío Comunicaciones and carries a pop format known as Radar 107.5.

History
XHQRO received its concession on March 20, 1986, signing on the very next day. It was known as XHCGT-FM and was the first FM station in Celaya.

In 2011, XHCGT was approved for a callsign change to XHQRO-FM, reflecting CBC's desire to use XHQRO as a move-in into the Querétaro radio market without relocating its transmitter. The station operates from studios in Querétaro and puts on live musical events there.

References

Radio stations in Guanajuato
Radio stations in Querétaro
Radio stations established in 1986